John Lyon, 4th Lord Glamis (died 1500), son of John Lyon, 3rd Lord Glamis, was a Scottish nobleman.  He married Elizabeth Gray, the daughter of Andrew, Lord Gray. They had two children:

George Lyon (d. 1505), who succeeded his father as Lord Glamis
John Lyon, who succeeded his brother as 6th Lord of Glamis

1500 deaths
15th-century Scottish peers
Year of birth unknown
Lords of Parliament (pre-1707)
Clan Lyon